Highland Cemetery is a cemetery located in Lock Haven, Clinton County, Pennsylvania, United States. Opened in 1867, the cemetery has over 9,000 graves, a public mausoleum and numerous private family mausolea. The cemetery has multiple unique and one of a kind graves and tombs. in 2015 and 2016 local police investigated multiple burglaries and vandalism cases at the cemetery in early 2017 five local residents were arrested in connection to the crimes.

Notable people buried at Highland 
 Jim Brown, (d. 1908), Major League Baseball player
 Davey Dunkle, (d. 1941), Major League Baseball player
 Benjamin Faunce (1873–1949), American pharmacist and businessman
 Albert Cole Hopkins, (d. 1911), politician
 Levi A. Mackey, (d. 1889), politician
 Alexander McDonald, (d. 1903), politician
 William T. Piper, (d. 1970), businessman and founder of Piper Aircraft
 William T. Piper Jr., (d. 2007), businessman, second president of Piper Aircraft and son of Piper Sr.
 Allison White, (d. 1886), politician

Reference

External links 
  GNIS data

1867 establishments in Pennsylvania
Cemeteries in Pennsylvania